The Imeri warbling antbird (Hypocnemis flavescens) is a species of bird in the family Thamnophilidae. It is found at lower levels in humid forest in southern Venezuela, south-eastern Colombia and north-western Brazil (west of the Branco River).

The Imeri warbling antbird was described by the English zoologist Philip Sclater in 1865 and given the binomial name Hypocnemis flavescens. Until recently, it was considered a subspecies of Hypocnemis cantator, but based on vocal differences and to a lesser degree differences in plumages it is now treated as a separate species.

There are two subspecies:
Hypocnemis flavescens flavescens Sclater, PL, 1865 – east Colombia, south Venezuela and northwest Brazil
Hypocnemis flavescens perflava Pinto, 1966 – central Roraima in northern Brazil

Its conservation status has been assessed by BirdLife International as Least Concern.

References

 Zimmer & Isler. 2003. Hypocnemis cantator (Warbling Antbird). Pp. 645 in del Hoyo, Elliott, & Christie. 2003. Handbook of the Birds of the World. Vol. 8. Broadbills to Tapaculos. Lynx Edicions. Barcelona.

External links
 Imeri Warbling-Antbird. arthurgrosset.com. Accessed 2008-06-27

Imeri warbling antbird
Birds of the Venezuelan Amazon
Imeri warbling antbird
Imeri warbling antbird